Damiba is a surname. Notable people with the surname include:

Noellie Marie Béatri Damiba (born 1951), Burkinabé journalist and diplomat
Paul-Henri Sandaogo Damiba (born 1981), Burkinabé military officer
Surnames of Burkinabé origin